Odontosida pusillus is a moth of the family Sphingidae first described by Rudolf Felder in 1874. It is known from South Africa.

The forewing upperside ground colour is pale grey, contrasting with the pale orange-brown hindwing upperside. The forewing underside is almost uniformly pale orange brown.

The larvae feed on Hermannia species.

References

Endemic moths of South Africa
Macroglossini
Moths described in 1874
Moths of Africa